Face 2 Face is a feature-length documentary directed by Katherine Brooks who traveled around the US to meet 50 of her Facebook friends she met online. These 50 people were chosen when Brooks posted a status update on her Facebook page that asked who was willing to spend a day with her and she would come to them and film the whole process. At the end of the project, 6 out of the 50 stories were edited into a film that was submitted to Sundance. Additional profits from the project were to be donated to the Trevor Project.

Theme
It has evolved to reach the hearts of hundreds and to make people think and realize how much time is being spent on Facebook and Twitter when compared to the time spent with our friends and family. This is the main motive Katherine will be exploring with the people she'll be spending a day with and by the time this project comes to an end, we all hope to find the answer to the question: "How much has technology helped us or harmed us with strengthening our relationships with the people we love". Questions such as "Are we really friends? Do you really know me? Can I trust you? Are machines taking over? Are we losing our ability to connect with each other? Do other people feel alone in the world like me?" was being by Brooks as she noticed the amount of time people spent on their phones and computers, even when they are with someone else at a cafe.

Beginning
In an interview given to Daily Brink during the Newport Beach Film Festival, Brooks explains how the idea for the project was born. Brooks said:

After receiving responses from more than 150 friends, the first 50 people were randomly chosen and then video journals about who is part of the project and which cities she was to travel were posted on Facebook and Twitter. The next step was to raise enough money to make the project more adventurous, exciting, and successful.

Kickstarter

The Kickstarter campaign lasted for over a month. From the generous donations and contributions by Brooks's friends, family, and sponsors, a total of more than $80,000 was funded successfully. The moment the campaigning began, the project raised more than $10,000 in just a week. During the campaigning, various kinds of rewards were announced and these rewards were chosen by the contributors according to the amount given. Rewards included a shout-out video, signed NOH8 photo-shoot pictures, spending a day with Brooks or a co-producer credit in the film. Also, text and video journals were posted to keep all the members updated on the progression and changes in the project.

Within three weeks of the campaigning, the project was successfully funded to its target goal of $50,000. But the contributions kept going on until the last hour of the period given. During this time, different forms of planning on how the film will be shot were declared. Some included hosting a first-ever 24 hours live documentary show, traveling around the country in an RV with the Face 2 Face designs on it, beanie hats with tiny cameras fitted inside, and so on. These proposals were posted as video journals by Katherine Brooks. But these were abandoned due to the staggering expense.

Filming

The filming of the project began in the first week of June. The first of the 50 friends Brooks met was in Fort Wayne, Indiana. After two weeks of driving around the east coast, Brooks has traveled to New York, Maine, New Hampshire, Massachusetts, and Rhode Island. She will also be traveling around Colorado, North Carolina, Texas, and California. The completion of the shooting for Face 2 Face was to be marked when she heads back to her home in New Orleans.

Impact

There was some discussion about the film on Facebook and Twitter. People were writing and sharing stories about how they found love and support through people they met from the project. These mutual Friends formed a group called the "Kat Pack". Brooks talked about the "Kat Pack" in interviews given to various radio shows such as LA Talk Radio with Sheena Metal, HayHouse Radio, and Talk Radio Europe.

Also, a Face 2 Face forum was developed by the team where followers are able to share personal stories, secrets, jokes and are also able to give advice, support, and love to the people who need it. Through this blog, many people are coming out with adventures that they would have never shared intimately with anyone in their life. This project has shown how deeply connected everyone can be, even though the medium to show is used through technology.

Press

Ever since the idea for Face 2 Face was born, there were press releases and publicity for the project, starting during the pre-production stage. Brooks gave various interviews to newspapers and journals, such as USA Today, Examiner.com, The Saratogian, and Daily Brink. Apart from these online blogs, articles about the movie appeared in The Salem News, SheWired, and so on. Brooks also appeared on radio talk shows, where she talked about the journey of Face 2 Face and the importance of it to her life and the "Kat Pack". Shows include LA Talk Radio, CBS Sky Radio with Zoe Moon, Wakin' Up with the Wolf, and Talk Radio Europe.

In an interview given to The Saratogian, a local newspaper in Saratoga Springs, New York, Brooks described her feelings and experiences after a week of traveling around the east coast. This interview was given during her visit to one of the Facebook Friends. In the article, she says there are different types of friendships one makes in their lifetime. There are friends whom you will spend time to just have a coffee, some you keep in touch through the various social networking sites, and others you add in your speed dial. Through this journey, Brooks recounts, she had added every friend she has met in her speed dial.

In another interview, Brooks explained her feelings for today's vast technological changes and her feelings on how it impacts our lives. She states:

In every interview given by Brooks, she clearly states that the purpose of the movie is to show people how important it really is to take some time off from the virtual world and instead, spending time with the people that matter to us the most in life. Friendships and relationships created online can not be fully trusted as you can be vulnerable to various faults and can cause harm to oneself and to others too. Also, the human body is like a machine that desires to be touched once in a while to experience the feeling of being loved.

References

External links
 Website
 
 LA Talk Radio interview

2012 films
American documentary films
2010s English-language films
Kickstarter-funded documentaries
2012 documentary films
2010s American films